Established in August 1996, Shanghai World Foreign Language Academy (aka. WFLA), previously known as Shanghai World Foreign Language Middle School (aka. WFLMS), is a private, coeducation, college preparatory day school located in the southwest part of Xuhui District in Shanghai.  The Xuhui District is generally seen as one of the most important education areas in Shanghai.  It is considered one of the most successfully run private schools in Shanghai since taken over by JuneYao Group in 2005. The school implements IBO concepts with AdvancED certification.

The school is divided into two campuses.  
 The Home campus (602 South Hongcao Road): 
The main campus of the school offers the national curriculum to from grade 6 to grade 9.
 The International campus (400 Baihua Street): 
The international division of the school, in operation since 2011, is home to students in the MYP and the DP programs.

Curriculum
The school's International Division for high school students (Year 10 - 12) offers 15 DP courses and 4 regular high school courses. Students who are full IB Diploma candidates are required to choose 6 DP courses while IB Course candidates are required to choose 4 DP courses, which include Language and Literature subject, Language Acquisition subject, and Mathematics are compulsory, so the 4th subject is an elective of the IB Course candidate's choice, along with 4 additional subjects of Communication, College Preparation, Environmental Science, and World History, to fulfill the requirement of obtaining a high school graduation certificate.

External links 
Shanghai World Foreign Language Middle School homepage Chinese
Shanghai World Foreign Language Middle School International Division Homepage English

Educational institutions established in 1996
International Baccalaureate schools in China
International schools in Shanghai
Private schools in Shanghai
1996 establishments in China